Sathupalli  is a town in Khammam district of the Indian state of Telangana. It is a Municipality in Sathupally mandal of Khammam revenue division.

Geography

Demographics 

 census of India, Sathupalli Nagar panchayat had a population of 98,615 of which 45,257 were male and 45,319 female with a sex ratio of 1019 against state average of 993. Child population (0–6 years) stands 9783 which is 9.87% of total population with a sex ratio of 1033 compared to 933 of state. Literacy rate stands at 82.37.

Governance 
The present member of legislative assembly is the Telangana Rashtra Samiti. Other political parties include the Telangana Rashtra Samithi, the Indian National Congress, the Bharatiya Janata Party, the CPI, and the CPI(M). The Telangana Christian Party (TCP), Hindu Praja Shakti Party (HPSP) and Jana Sena Party head offices are located in Sathupally.

Economy 
Singareni Collieries Company
Jalagam Vengalarao (JVR) Opencast coal mine is situated in the Godavari Valley coal belt of Sathupalli- Chintalapudi, West Godavari district. The 10 MTPA coal mine stretches over an area of 1956,89 ha. It is located in Ayyagaripeta & Komapalli villages, Mandal Sathupalli, Khammam district, Telangana state, India.

JVR coal mines consist of two adjacent mines JVR OC-I and JVR OC-II. JVR OC-I started production as a Sathupalli opencast mine at a capacity of 0.7 MTPA in 2005 and was granted environmental clearance on 16 September 2004. On 27 July 2007, Sathupalli coal mine obtained additional environmental clearance for a 2.5 MTPA rise in output and was renamed JVR OC-I.The JVR OC-I expansion project of capacity of 5.0 MTPA was started on 23 February 2015 and coal production was started on 31 March 2015. JVR OC-I has produced 100+ Crore revenue so far(2020). 

On 28 March 2010, JVR OC-II received its environmental clearance for a maximum capacity of 5 MTPA over a lease area of 1409.81 ha.

JVR Opencast Project-II, The proposed project is designed for an annual rated capacity of 10 MTPA on a 1910.09 ha area. The project's balance of extractable reserves is 245,51 Mt, with a projected life of 28 years. It is also intended to set up a 4 MTPA coal washer in 13.03 ha of land within the project area in order to wash the coal having an average G12 grade to acquire G9 grade coal.

Industries 
Mega Food Parks
Sathupalli mandal, the district's agricultural and horticultural centre, is expected to soon become a major food processing centre in the state with the formal start of work on the long-awaited Buggapadu mega-food park. Ministry of Food Processing Industries (MoFPI), Government of India has sanctioned Mega Food Parks in Sathupalli, Telangana State.

Industries Minister K. T. Rama Rao laid the foundation stone for the formally kick-starting works of the Rs 110-crore project on the Central Processing Center (CPC) and other infrastructure facilities on around 60 acres in Buggapadu near Sathupalli.

The project has been initiated by Telangana State Industrial Infrastructure Corporation (TSIIC) under the Union Ministry of Food Processing Industries' Mega Food Parks scheme.

The project aims at facilitating the establishment of a cluster of food processing units, building an efficient supply chain from farm to market, growing farmers ' incomes, and focusing on the district 's enormous growth potential for food processing industry. The CPC will be designed on the Industrial Park Model lines that encompass sewage and wastewater treatment plants, roads, power lines and other infrastructure facilities needed to allow prospective entrepreneurs to set up food processing units under the project.

Core processing infrastructure components such as warehouse, deep freeze, cold storage, aseptic packaging line and other facilities will be provided on a "user fee" basis.

Transport 

As Sathupally is located on National Highway 365BB (India), it is well connected to major cities and towns in Telangana and Andhra Pradesh. Telangana State Road Transport Corporation (TSRTC) Sathupalli Depot operates regular bus services to cities like Hyderabad, Khammam, Suryapet, Vijayawada, Rajamundry, Eluru, Karimnagar, Badhrachalam, Kandukuru.

Notable people 
 Ananya Nagalla, film actress
 Hanu Raghavapudi, film director and screenwriter
 Jalagam Vengala Rao, former chief minister of united Andhra Pradesh
 Thummala Nageswara Rao, Telangana Rashtra Samithi (TRS) politician
 Rohini Sindhuri, civil servant

References

Cities and towns in Khammam district